Carobbio degli Angeli is a comune (municipality) in the Province of Bergamo in the Italian region of Lombardy, located about  northeast of Milan and about  southeast of Bergamo.

Carobbio degli Angeli borders the following municipalities: Bolgare, Chiuduno, Gandosso, Gorlago, Grumello del Monte, Trescore Balneario.

History
The village has Roman origins. In the 14th century AD it received a castle. Later it was a possession of the Republic of Venice.

The current comune was created in 1928 through the merger of Carobbio and Santo Stefano degli Angeli.

Main sights
Castello degli Angeli ("Castle of the Angels")
Villa Riccardi, used by the bishops of Bergamo for their leisure.

References